Spruce Falls may refer to:

Spruce Falls, Saskatchewan
Spruce Falls Mill, a pulp and paper mill owned by Tembec in Kapuskasing, Ontario